Novo Rio Bus Terminal is the main bus station in Rio de Janeiro, Rio de Janeiro State, Brazil. The terminal was constructed in 1965 and was built for the proximity to Centro and key routes in and out of Rio de Janeiro.

Services
The station has services to the state of Rio de Janeiro as well as other areas of Brazil and neighbouring countries such as Argentina, Chile, Paraguay and Bolivia.

References

1965 establishments in Brazil
Bus stations in Brazil
Public transport in Rio de Janeiro (city)
Buildings and structures completed in 1965